Nepali Congress (Rastrabadi) is a political party in Nepal. The party was founded in 2005 by Dura Pokharal (president) and Prakash Koirala. The party is registered with the Election Commission of Nepal ahead of the 2008 Constituent Assembly election.

References

2005 establishments in Nepal
Rastrabadi
Political parties established in 2005
Political parties in Nepal